Group 2 of UEFA Euro 1992 was one of the two groups in the final tournament's initial group stage. It began on 12 June and was completed on 18 June. The group consisted of the Netherlands, Scotland, Germany and the CIS, a team composed of players from 12 of the 15 former Soviet Union members.

The Netherlands won the group and advanced to the semi-finals, along with Germany. Scotland and the CIS failed to advance.

Teams

Notes

Standings

In the semi-finals,
The winner of Group 2, Netherlands, advanced to play the runner-up of Group 1, Denmark.
The runner-up of Group 2, Germany, advanced to play the winner of Group 1, Sweden.

Matches

Netherlands vs Scotland

CIS vs Germany

Scotland vs Germany

Netherlands vs CIS

Netherlands vs Germany

Scotland vs CIS

References

External links
UEFA Euro 1992 Group 2

Group 2
Group
Group
Group
Group